Oyi is a Local Government Area in Anambra State, Nigeria. It is home to the Oyi people. The towns that make up the local government are Nkwelle-Ezunaka, Awkuzu, Ogbunike, Umuneba, Umunya and Nteje.

Oyi/Ayamelum is a Federal Constituency represented by Hon Chinedu Eluemuno at the Federal House of Representatives, Abuja. Oyi have had many Council Chairmen including Chief Okonkwo Onuigbo (from Omor), Barr Solomon Ekwenze, Barr. Ifeyinwa Morah and Hon. Edwin Aghadiuno.

History

Oral history
The origin of Oyi people is the same for all the "OLU" sub group of the Eri-Awka Igbo. The Olus are the distinct river-side Igbo people of the lower Anambra plain (Anambra River Basin), encompassing the entire old Anambra Division of the 1920s to the 80s, parts of today's Awka North LGA of Anambra State and the excision of the former Uzo-Uwani LGA of now Enugu State. A number of Olu people also speak Igala language. In fact, Igala kingdom is considered to have been founded by an Olu 'refugee' prince. Olu trace their origin to Eri (Eru, Nri, Nru). Onitsha and Ogbaru areas by character and dialect, are sometimes considered as Olu (though with specific associations). It is said that the more ancient forms of Igbo Tradition and Cultural practices like music, marriage ceremony and religious worships are those still practiced by the Olu.

Lifestyle
Oyi people, like other Olu people, are usually tall, care-free and socially progressive people (Read the 'burial of Oramalidike' and discourse of the Head of the Nze-Na-Ozo with Ozo initiates (Ndi-Nze) in 'Ozo Title: An Ancestral Club In The Igbo Culture by C.N.C Igboegbuna, published by Snaap Press, Enugu 1984). Olu life used to be nature-centered (agrarian of 'water' and land) until the white man upset all that with his "civilisation". Olu or riverine Igbo have very elaborate ceremonies, festivities and roles. They are quite egalitarian in belief and republican in their political pursuits. Oyi practice a Jewish-like Kabbalah (Cabbala) system of self-actualisation which is embedded in the apical Nze-na-Ozo tradition of "Onye chizue; o bulu Mmoo, bulukwa Mmadu". Translated, this simply says that the Ozo initiation is a threshold vista of self-distinction that transforms the initiates into both man and spirit or "spirit-man". This ancient Ozo system called Ozo-Atulukpa-Okala was instituted in Umunya as far back as the late 16th Century by a war chieftain named Igboegbunammadu Onenulu (Ozo-Odezulu-Igbo l). He equally bequeathed the title to his friends within the Olu sub-clans, from Ogbunike to Awkuzu and it is severally called and known as 'Ozo-Ndi-Ichie,' 'Nnekwu Ozo,' etc.

Council history
Oyi is a Local Government Area of Anambra State, southeastern Nigeria. The towns that make up the local government are Nkwelle-Ezunaka, Awkuzu, Ogbunike, Umunya and Nteje. Oyi is in the epicenter of the present Anambra State and was first created by the Civilian Administration of Chief Jim Ifeanyichukwu Nwobodo in the 1980s with Umunya as its Headquarters, with Ogbefi Jasper Nwobi as its first chairman.   It took its name from the pacific and famous Oyi River that flows northwards into Omambala (Anambra River).

When the military sacked the civilian administration of Alhaji Shehu Shagari under which Chief Jim Nwobodo was governor in 1983, Oyi and its constituent towns were drawn back into the old Anambra Local Government Area with Otuocha as headquarters. Later, under the administration of Col Robert Nnameka Akonobi as Governor under Gen Ibrahim Badamosi Babangida, Enugu became a State and the former Uzo-Uwani Local Government Area towns of Omor, Omasi, Umueje, Umelum, Igbakwu, Umumbo, Anaku and Ifite Ogwari were merged with their more "Olu" brothers in Oyi. Nteje became the headquarters and has remained so even after the excision of the towns into now Ayamelum Local Government Area.

Popular places and sites

Ogbunike Caves The most popular place to visit in Oyi is the Ogbunike Caves, listed by UNESCO as a world Heritage Site. The cave is situated in the Ogba hills, across the Ugwu-Aga Escarpment, Umunya by the Enugu/Onitsha Expressway. It lies in the coordinates of N06 11 11 and E06 54 21.

Umunya Aparition Site Umunya Aparition Site during the "Messages" in the 90s, is considered the highest human traffic to the Eastern Nigeria, since the visits of Pope John Paul II to Onitsha. The Site is esconced within the Mmili Nwaonye Artificial Spring of Iyi-Ogwe Farm by the Onitsha/Enugu Expressway, Umunya. It hosts a moderate Catholic Chapel, used by tourists to conduct prayers and adoration.

Urunda CrescendoThis scenic depression is a wonderful expression of a 'natural stadium'. It lies depressed to the Ugwu-Aga table, close to the Ogba. It has a cool spring and a youth center. There are meandering brooks and streams across the area and one of them enters a hole to 'the unknown'.

Notable residents
 Rt. Hon. Dr. Chuba Okadigbo, former Senate President and Vice Presidential Candidate of All Nigeria Peoples Party (ANPP)
 Cyprian Ekwensi, MFR, writer and poet 
 Pete Edochie, MON, art commentator and actor 
 Ngozi Ezeonu, Nollywood actress

Schools
Schools in Oyi Local Government Area:

 Tansian University, Umunya
 Community Secondary School, Awkuzu
 Creative Minds Foundation, Nkisi Comprehensive Schools (Nursery, Primary, Secondary), Nkwelle-Ezunaka
 Unity Secondary School, Awkuzu
 Women Educational Centre, Awkuzu
 Model Comprehensive Secondary School, Nkwelle-Ezunaka
 Community High School, Nkwelle-Ezunaka
 Boys’ High School, Nteje
 New Era Secondary School, Nteje
 Marist Comprehensive College, Nteje
 Cave City Secondary School, Ogbunike
 St Monica's College (formerly, Teachers Training College), Ogbunike
 Progressive Secondary School, Umunya
 Community Secondary School, Umunya

climate
The climate in Oyi is tropical monsoon. Throughout the year the temperatures are high and have a lot of rainfall.

References

 Achebe, Chinua. Things Fall Apart 1959. London: Penguin, 2006 
 Achebe, Chinua. No Longer At Ease, Heinemann African Writers Series, London 1960.
 Achebe, Chinua. Arrow of God, Heinemenn African Writers Series, London 1964.
 Floyd, B. N. and Menakaya (ed) Macmillan Junior Atlas For Nigeria, Macmillan Press. London, 1965
 Okee Igboegbunam Onenulu-Ozo: Okpuru and Urunda - Echoes of The Dead Forgotten (unpublished), 2004
 Igboegbuna, C.N.C. Ozo Title: An Ancestral Club In The Igbo Culture, Snaap Press Ltd. Enugu, 1994
 Igboegbunam, Okechukwu Lawrence: Sustainable Tourism Development For Anambra State Nigeria (Application of Leadership Concept in setting up an Eco-tourism Potential, "Plateau Rivulet Trail"), Institute Optopreneur, Malaysia.  2009
 Obidigbo, Chike and Igboegbuna C.N.C (eds), Umunya: A Typical Igbo Community Charting A New Order, Hardis & Dromedas Ltd, Enugu, 2009.
 LOCAL GOVERNMENT AREAS IN ANAMBRA STATE dated July 21, 2007; accessed October 4, 2007

Local Government Areas in Anambra State
Local Government Areas in Igboland